An election to Denbighshire County Council took place on 5 May 2022 as part of the 2022 Welsh local elections. The previous elections took place in May 2017 and the next are scheduled to happen in 2027

Ward changes
Following a ward boundary review by the Local Democracy and Boundary Commission for Wales, the number of Denbighshire County Council wards was reduced from 30 to 29, while the number of councillors increased from 47 to 48. Twenty three wards saw no change, though other wards had their boundaries redrawn and/or their names changed.

Results 
No party gained an overall majority, though the Labour Party became the largest group. The Conservative Party lost nine seats, including that of their Group leader, Julian Thompson-Hill. The council gained its first ever representatives from the Green Party, who won seats in Prestatyn Central and St Asaph East. The overall turnout was 38.6%.

Ward results

* = denotes councillor elected to this ward at the 2017 elections

Denbighshire Council results per ward also give the number of registered electors

Alyn Valley (one seat)

Mendies stood unsuccessfully in the Trefnant ward in 2017. Alyn Valley is a new ward, formerly part of the Llanarmon-yn-Ial/Llandegla ward.

Bodelwyddan (one seat)

Denbigh Caledfryn Henllan (three seats)

The former wards of Denbigh Central and Denbigh Upper/Henllan were merged, following the local government boundary review, becoming Denbigh Caledfryn Henllan. The ward retained the overall number of three councillors. Lloyd-Williams had been elected as a Labour councillor for Denbigh Upper/Henllan at the 2017 elections.

Denbigh Lower (two seats)

Dyserth (one seat)

Efenechdyd (one seat)

Ward boundaries remained the same, but the official name of the ward was changed from Efenechtyd to Efenechdyd.

Edeirnion (one seat)

Formed from the merger of the former Corwen and Llandrillo wards.

Llandyrnog (one seat)

Llanfair Dyffryn Clwyd Gwyddelwern (one seat)

Llangollen (two seats)

Llanrhaeadr-yng-Nghinmeirch (one seat)

Moel Famau (one seat)

Moel Famau was a new ward, formed by the merger of the former Llanbedr Dyffryn Clwyd/Llangynhafal ward and the community of Llanferres. Huw Williams had been elected as a Conservative councillor for Llanbedr Dyffryn Clwyd/Llangynhafal at the 2017 elections.

Prestatyn Central (two seats)

Prestatyn East (two seats)

Prestatyn Meliden (one seat)

Prestatyn North (three seats)

Paul Penlington was elected in 2017 for the Labour Party.

Prestatyn South West (two seats)

Rhuddlan (two seats)

Rhyl East (two seats)

Rhyl South (two seats)

Rhyl South West (two seats)

Rhyl Trellewellyn (two seats)

The former ward of Rhyl South East was divided, following the local government boundary review, into Rhyl Trellewellyn and Rhyl Ty Newydd, with an overall increase of councillors from three to four. The two wards match the boundaries of the Trellewellyn and Ty Newydd wards to Rhyl Town Council.

Rhyl Ty Newydd (two seats)

Jones had previously been a councillor for the former Rhyl South East ward and had also been a cabinet member in the Conservative administration. Blakeley and Williams were also previously councillors for Rhyl South East.

Rhyl West (two seats)

Ruthin (three seats)

St Asaph East (one seat)

St Asaph West (one seat)

Trefnant (one seat)

Tremeirchion (one seat)

References 

Denbighshire County Council elections
2022 Welsh local elections